Carlos Joel Castro de Sousa (born 17 March 2000) is a Portuguese footballer who plays as a goalkeeper for Tondela.

Professional career
On 10 September 2020, Sousa signed his first professional contract with Tondela, and immediately joined Molelos on loan for the 2019-20 season. He made his professional debut with Tondela in a 1-0 win against Felgueiras for the Taça de Portugal he then played for the first time in the league in a 2-0 Primeira Liga loss to Vitória de Guimarães on 27 November 2020.

References

External links
 
 

2000 births
Living people
Portuguese footballers
Association football goalkeepers
C.D. Tondela players
A.R.C. Oleiros players
Primeira Liga players
Campeonato de Portugal (league) players
Sportspeople from Viseu District